Lajeado is a municipality located in the Brazilian state of Tocantins.

The municipality contains 12% of the  Lajeado State Park.

References

Municipalities in Tocantins